David Strahan (21 October 1874 – 4 April 1938) was an Australian rules footballer who played with Melbourne in the Victorian Football League (VFL).

Notes

External links 

1874 births
1938 deaths
Australian rules footballers from Victoria (Australia)
Melbourne Football Club players